Nikitenko is a Ukrainian surname. Notable people with the surname include:

 Alexander Nikitenko (1804–1877), Russian journalist
 Andrei Nikitenko (born 1979), Russian ice hockey player
 Lyubov Nikitenko (born 1948), Kazakhstani hurdler
 Sviatoslav Nikitenko (born 1960), Ukrainian glyptic artist
 Viktor Nikitenko (born 1947), Russian football coach
 Yuriy Nikitenko (born 1974), Ukrainian footballer

See also
 

Ukrainian-language surnames